Staraya Sloboda is a rural locality (a selo) in Slednevskoye Rural Settlement, Alexandrovsky District, Vladimir Oblast, Russia. The population was 56 as of 2010. There are 11 streets.

Geography 
The village is located 6 km north-west from Alexandrov.

References 

Rural localities in Alexandrovsky District, Vladimir Oblast